Milan Rašić ( born February 2, 1985, in Niš, SR Serbia, Yugoslavia) is a Serbian volleyball player. He was a member of the national team at the 2012 Summer Olympics in London.

References

External links
 Milan Rasic - Sports-Reference.com
 at volley trend

Living people
1985 births
Sportspeople from Niš
Serbian men's volleyball players
Olympic volleyball players of Serbia
Volleyball players at the 2012 Summer Olympics
European Games competitors for Serbia
Volleyball players at the 2015 European Games
European champions for Serbia
Serbian expatriate sportspeople in Slovenia
Serbian expatriate sportspeople in France
Serbian expatriate sportspeople in Iran